Lukáš Kožienka (born  in Trstená) is a Slovak bobsledder.

Kožienka competed at the 2014 Winter Olympics for Slovakia. He teamed with driver Milan Jagnešák, Petr Narovec and Juraj Mokráš in the four-man event, finishing 25th.

References

1989 births
Living people
Olympic bobsledders of Slovakia
People from Trstená
Sportspeople from the Žilina Region
Bobsledders at the 2014 Winter Olympics
Slovak male bobsledders